Boston (occasionally referred to as "Little Boston" to distinguish it from the Massachusetts capital city) is a census-designated place located in Elizabeth Township, Allegheny County in the state of Pennsylvania.  As of the 2020 census the population was 549.

Demographics

References

Census-designated places in Allegheny County, Pennsylvania
Census-designated places in Pennsylvania